James Edward DeGrange Sr. (born September 24, 1949) is an American politician from Maryland and a member of the Democratic Party. He completed his third term in the Maryland State Senate, representing Maryland's district 32 in Anne Arundel County, at the end of 2018.

Background
DeGrange was born in Baltimore, Maryland, but grew up in Anne Arundel County. He graduated from Glen Burnie High School in 1968 and attended Anne Arundel Community College. He served in the United States Army Reserve from 1968 to 1974. He is the Vice-President of the DeGrange Lumber Company.

Political career
DeGrange's political career began with his service on the Maryland Lottery Commission, on which he served from 1991 to 1999. In 1994, he was elected to serve on the Anne Arundel County Council. After one term on the council, he ran for and won the district 32 seat in the State Senate. DeGrange sat on the Budget and Taxation Committee and served as Vice-Chair of the Executive Nominations Committee.

DeGrange currently lives in Baywood delaware.

References

1949 births
Living people
21st-century American politicians
Democratic Party Maryland state senators
Politicians from Baltimore
Members of Anne Arundel County Council
Businesspeople from Baltimore
United States Army reservists
United States Army soldiers
Anne Arundel Community College people